Andronika is an Albanian feminine first name. It became popular amongst Albanians after Skanderbeg married Donika Arianiti.

Etymology
The name comes from Albanian, meaning "Awokened" (from a dream).", enlightened, albanian "Andron"-dreams and "ika"-escape, get away.

References

Albanian feminine given names